Rajpurohit (Sanskrit:राजपुरोहित) is a Brahmin sub caste residing in South Asia natively in western Rajasthan of India. They maintain traditions that are similar to both Brahmins and Rajputs. They are historically engaged into administration, trading, jagirdar, royal council Member and are spread across entire country. They were given villages at boundary of kingdom. According to political analysts, Rajput, Rajpurohit and Charan communities are considered to be identical in regards to their social customs and political ideologies.

Social Structure 
Rajpurohits are a Brahmin community, who as a rule, did not provide Brahminical services as expected with the caste duties of Brahmins Their ancestors are Brahmins of different sub castes such as-Gaur,Paliwal,Pushkarna,Nagar,Pareek,Khandelwal,Dadheech and Bias but most of them has gaur linage. Though they have been described as a Brahmin group which mediates matrimonial alliances of Rajputs, they did not play any role in actual rituals of the wedding for which the services of a regular Brahmin were employed. they take part in battlefield, business, promoting culture through arts, educational services etc.

Political activities
The Rajpurohit community had previously been allied primarily with the Bharatiya Janata Party. In 2009, however, the community switched loyalties to the Indian National Congress, due to perceived neglect by the BJP.

Notable Historical figures

Purohit Devidas
Purohit of Rao Lunkaran who fought for him in almost every battles of him and died along with Lunkaran and his sons against Nawab of Narnaul.

Purohit Narain Das
Naraian das fought and died in the
Siege of Chittorgarh (1535).

Rajpurohit Pratap Singh Mulrajot
Pratap singhji fought and attain Martyrdom in the Battle of Sammel

Gopinath and Jagannath Purohit
Both of them fought with Maharana Pratap against Mughals.

Teja Purohit
Teja was Minister of peace and war for Rana Kumbha i.e Kumbha of Mewar.

Garibdas Purohit
Purohit Garibdas was a great military general of Maharana Raj Singh. He commanded the forces of Mewar in the battles of Aravali hills.

Rajpurohit Kesari Singh Akherjot
Chief commander of Abhai Singh of Marwar in the Battle of Ahmedabad against Mughal governor Sarbuland Khan.

Purohit Jag Nath
Jag Nath purohit was the chief commander and purohit to Bakht Singh of Marwar His father Jaideo purohit was a पुष्करणा Brahmin who helped Durgadas Rathore and protected young  Ajit Singh.

Legacy

Rajpurohit paintings

Memorials

Notable members of the Rajpurohit community
 Sant Kheteswara - Notable saint of Rajasthan.
 Govind Singh Rajpurohit, an Indian legal educational administrator.
 Gulab Singh Rajpurohit is an Indian politician from the Bharatiya Janata Party.
 Jethu Singh Rajpurohit, an Indian politician and member of the Indian National Congress from Bali, Rajasthan.
 Shankar Singh Rajpurohit, an Indian politician from the Bharatiya Janata Party.

References
Notes

Citations

Social groups of India
Social groups of Rajasthan